Farhan Akhtar (born 9 January 1974) is an Indian film director, screenwriter, producer, actor, playback singer and television host. Born in Mumbai to screenwriters Javed Akhtar and Honey Irani, he grew up under the influence of the Hindi film industry. He began his career in Bollywood by working as an assistant director in Lamhe (1991) and Himalay Putra (1997).

Farhan, after establishing a production company named Excel Entertainment along with Ritesh Sidhwani, made his directorial debut with the coming-of-age comedy-drama Dil Chahta Hai (2001) and received widespread critical acclaim for portraying the modern Indian youth. The film also won the National Film Award for Best Feature Film in Hindi. Following it, he directed the war film Lakshya (2004) and had his Hollywood debut through the soundtrack of Bride and Prejudice (2004), for which he wrote the lyrics. He went on to make the commercially successful Don (2006). He directed a short film titled Positive (2007), to spread awareness on HIV-AIDS.

Although he initially started his acting career with The Fakir of Venice, his official debut was with Rock On!! (2008), for which he won a second National Film Award for Best Feature Film in Hindi as producer, and indulged in further experimentation before he wrote the dialogues, produced and acted for the critical and commercial success Zindagi Na Milegi Dobara (2011), which won him four Filmfare Awards, including Best Supporting Actor. In the same year, he directed a sequel to Don titled Don 2 (2011), which remains his highest-grossing film till date. He achieved further success by portraying Milkha Singh in the 2013 biopic Bhaag Milkha Bhaag, earning him the Filmfare Award for Best Actor. In 2016, he received praise for starring in the crime thriller Wazir and the ensemble family comedy-drama Dil Dhadakne Do.

Awards and nominations

See also
 List of accolades received by Zindagi Na Milegi Dobara
 List of accolades received by Dil Dhadakne Do

References

External links
 

Lists of awards received by Indian actor